The 2022–23 season is the 119th in the history of Floridsdorfer AC and their 9th consecutive season in the top flight. The club are participating in the Austrian Football Second League and the Austrian Cup.

Players

First team squad

Out on loan

Transfers

Pre-season and friendlies

Competitions

Overall record

Austrian Football Second League

League table

Results summary

Results by round

Matches 
The league fixtures were announced on 24 June 2022.

Austrian Cup

References

Floridsdorfer AC
Floridsdorfer AC